João Henriques was the first Captain-major of Portuguese Ceylon. Henriques was appointed in 1551 under John III of Portugal, he was Captain-major until 1551. He was succeeded by Diogo de Melo Coutinho.

References

Captain-majors of Ceilão
16th-century Portuguese people